The 2016 Scandinavian Pro Tour consisted of 8 darts tournaments on the 2016 PDC Pro Tour.

Prize money
The prize money for each of the Scandinavian Pro Tour events had a prize fund of €5,000.

This is how the prize money is divided:

January

Scandinavian Pro Tour 1
Pro Tour 1 was contested on Saturday 30 January 2016 at the Hotel Gustavelund in Tuusula, Finland.

Scandinavian Pro Tour 2
Pro Tour 2 was contested on Sunday 31 January 2016 at the Hotel Gustavelund in Tuusula, Finland.

March

Scandinavian Pro Tour 3
Pro Tour 3 was contested on Saturday 19 March 2016 at the Hotel Park Inn by Radisson in Copenhagen, Denmark.

Scandinavian Pro Tour 4
Pro Tour 4 was contested on Sunday 20 March 2016 at the Hotel Park Inn by Radisson in Copenhagen, Denmark.

August

Scandinavian Pro Tour 5
Pro Tour 5 was contested on Saturday 27 August 2016 at the Apple Hotel in Gothenburg, Sweden.

Scandinavian Pro Tour 6
Pro Tour 6 was contested on Sunday 28 August 2016 at the Apple Hotel in Gothenburg, Sweden.

October

Scandinavian Pro Tour 7
Pro Tour 7 was contested on Saturday 8 October 2016 at the Apple Hotel in Gothenburg, Sweden.

Scandinavian Pro Tour 8
Pro Tour 8 was contested on Sunday 9 October 2016 at the Apple Hotel in Gothenburg, Sweden.

References

2016 in darts
2016 PDC Pro Tour